Kashubia or Cassubia is a language area in the historic Eastern Pomerania (Pomerelia) region of northern Poland. It is defined by the widespread use of the Kashubian language.

Location and geography

Located west of Gdańsk (inclusive of all but the easternmost district) and the mouth of the Vistula river, it is inhabited by members of the Kashubian ethnic group. The region is home to the Kashubian Lake District. According to the 1999 basic study Geografia współczesnych Kaszub (Geography of present-day Kashubia) by the Gdańsk scholar Jan Mordawski 43 municipalities (gminas) of the Pomeranian Voivodeship have a Kashubian share of at least one third of the total population:

 Cities: Gdynia (Gdiniô) 
 Bytów County (Bëtowsczi kréz): Town of Bytów (Bëtowò) with Gmina Bytów, Gmina Czarna Dąbrówka (Czôrnô Dãbrówka), Gmina Lipnica (Lëpnica), Gmina Parchowo (Parchòwò), Gmina Tuchomie (Tëchòmié)
 Chojnice County (Chònicczi kréz): Town of Brusy (Brusë) with Gmina Brusy, Gmina Chojnice (Chojnice), Gmina Konarzyny (Kònarzënë)
 Człuchów County (Człëchòwsczi kréz): Gmina Przechlewo (Przechlewò)
 Lębork County (Lãbòrsczi kréz): Gmina Cewice (Céwice)
 Kartuzy County (Kartësczi kréz): Town of Kartuzy (Kartuzë) with Gmina Kartuzy, Town of Żukowo (Żukòwò) with Gmina Żukowo, Gmina Chmielno (Chmielno), Gmina Przodkowo (Przedkòwò), Gmina Sulęczyno (Sëlëczëno), Gmina Sierakowice (Sërakòjce), Gmina Somonino (Somònino), Gmina Stężyca (Stãżëca)
 Kościerzyna County (Kòscérsczi kréz): Town of Kościerzyna (Kòscérzëna) with Gmina Kościerzyna, Gmina Dziemiany (Dzemiónë), Gmina Karsin (Kôrsëno), Gmina Lipusz (Lëpùsz), Gmina Nowa Karczma (Nowô Karczma)
 Puck County (Pùcczi kréz): Town of Puck (Pùck) with Gmina Puck, towns of Hel (Hél), Jastarnia (Jastarniô) and Władysławowo (Wiôlgô Wies), Gmina Kosakowo (Kòsôkòwò), Gmina Krokowa (Krokòwa)
 Wejherowo County (Wejrowsczi kréz): Town of Wejherowo (Wejrowò) and Gmina Wejherowo, towns of Reda (Réda) and Rumia (Rëmiô), Gmina Choczewo (Chòczewò), Gmina Gniewino (Gniewino), Gmina Linia (Lëniô), Gmina Luzino (Lëzëno), Gmina Łęczyce (Łãczëce), Gmina Szemud (Szëmôłd)

Culture

Kashubian emblem and flag 
Although there are no legal regulations regarding the use of Kashubian symbols, the griffin, i.e. a mythical animal, derived from antiquity, is considered the emblem and symbol of the Kashubians. The Kashubian griffin is in black on a yellow background (optionally golden). The colors of the Kashubian flag are taken from the emblem - the upper color is black, and the lower one is yellow (golden). A Kashubian flag with a griffin in the center is also used. If there is an emblem on the flag, then the background is yellow.

Embroidery 
Embroidery is an important part of Kashubian culture which uses seven colours; three shades of blue representing the sky, the lakes and Baltic Sea, green representing the meadows and forests, yellow representing the sun, red representing the peoples' love for the region, and the black representing the hard work of the Kashubians. Its origins date back to the early 13th century.

Cuisine 
Kashubian cuisine is mostly based on fish and meat. Grain is also widely used within Kashubian dishes. Herring are the most widely used fish due to their high numbers in the region. Mushrooms are also a part of Kashubia's wide variety of dishes.

Music 
Kashubia has a wide variety of music; Zemia Rodnô is widely considered to be the anthem of Kashubia. The most recognised Kashubian song is Kaszëbsczé nótë, a traditional song that is the most recognisable part of Kashubian folklore. Dances are also a noticeable part of Kashubian culture, which are moderately energetic, except for a few. The most famous dance is the Kòséder.

Language 
According to Edwin Rozenkranz, the term "Kashubia" was introduced to Gdańsk Pomerania by Slavic displaced people from Western Pomerania (mainly knights), who had to give way to German colonists over time. The name stuck to these lands at the end of the Middle Ages, and it was popularized in the 16th century. Therefore, the Kashubian language is a Slavic language with some German influences with the status of an official language since 2005.

Religion 
The population of the region, alike the majority of Poland, is predominantly Catholic. Important regional Catholic sites include the Wejherowo Calvary in Wejherowo, and the Church of the Assumption within the former Carthusian monastery in Kartuzy.

References

External links 
 kaszubia.com
 kaszebsko.com
 Ducatus Pomeraniae Tabula Generalis in Qua sunt Ducatus Pomeraniae, Stettinensis, Cassubiae,... 1680

Kashubia
Pomerania
Regions of Poland
Historical regions in Poland